Kim Maltman (born 1951) is a Canadian poet and physicist who lives in Toronto, Ontario.  He is a professor of applied mathematics at York University and pursues research in theoretical nuclear/particle physics. He is serving as a judge for the 2019 Griffin Poetry Prize.

Works 
The Country of the Mapmakers (1977), 
The Sicknesses of Hats (1982), 
Branch Lines (1982), 
Softened Violence (1984), 
The Transparence of November / Snow (1985),  (with Roo Borson)
Technologies/Installations (1990), 
Introduction to the Introduction to Wang Wei (2000),  (by Pain Not Bread)

External links
 Archives of Kim Maltman (Roo Robson and Kim Maltman fonds, (R12759) are held at Library and Archives Canada

1951 births
Living people
20th-century Canadian poets
Scientists from Toronto
Writers from Toronto
Particle physicists
Academic staff of York University
Canadian male poets
20th-century Canadian male writers
21st-century Canadian male writers
21st-century Canadian poets
Canadian nuclear physicists
Canadian particle physicists
20th-century Canadian scientists
21st-century Canadian scientists